is a Japanese actor and voice actor from Gifu Prefecture, Japan. He is attached to Aoni Production. He is the best official dubbing roles for Bradley Cooper, Hyun Bin, So Ji-sub and many more.

Biography

Filmography

Television animation
Turn A Gundam (1999), Yanny Oviess
Naruto (2003), Yoroi Akado
Bleach (2004), Saito Eikichiro
Eyeshield 21 (2005), Agon Kongo
Yakitate!! Japan (2005), Spencer Henry Hokou
Saru Get You -On Air- (2006), Pipotron Kuratsuku
Darker than Black (2007), Amagiri
Death Note (2007), Aiber
Kamisama Dolls (2011), Kyousuke Karahari
Naruto: Shippuden (2011), Sadai
Eureka Seven: AO (2012), Gazelle
Sword Art Online (2012), Sigurd
Sasami-san@Ganbaranai (2013), Susano'o
JoJo's Bizarre Adventure: Stardust Crusaders (2014), J. Geil
Marvel Disk Wars: The Avengers (2014), Sabretooth
World Trigger (2014), Masamune Kido
Gangsta. (2015), Ivan Glazyev
Pretty Guardian Sailor Moon Crystal (2016), Dr. Tomoe
Naruto: Shippuden (2016), En Oyashiro
Chaos;Child (2017), Takeshi Shinjō
Kado: The Right Answer (2017), Takumi Gonno
One Piece (2017), Charlotte Cracker
Overlord II (2018), Elias Brandt Dale Raeven
Zoids Wild (2018), Ikazuchi
Fairy Tail (2019), Belserion
Black Rock Shooter: Dawn Fall (2022), Colonel [David]
Technoroid Overmind (2023), Hakushū Shibaura

Theatrical animation
 Summer Wars (2009), Riichi Jinnouchi
 You Are Umasou (2010), Gonza
 Saint Seiya: Legend of Sanctuary (2014), Pisces Aphrodite
 City Hunter the Movie: Shinjuku Private Eyes (2019)

Original video animation (OVA)
Yukikaze (2002), Richard Burgadish
Freedom (2006), Taira
Fist of the North Star: Legend of Yuria (2007), Shin

Video games
Ace Combat Zero: The Belkan War (2006), Larry Foulke
Armored Core: Last Raven (2006), Evangel
Dynasty Warriors and Warriors Orochi series (2007), Zhuge Dan
Ryū ga Gotoku 3 (2009), Wakazo
Trinity: Souls of Zill O'll (2010), Areus
Ryū ga Gotoku 5 (2012), Seiji Kousaka
OZMAFIA!! (2013), Caesar
JoJo's Bizarre Adventure: All-Star Battle (2013), Whitesnake/C-Moon
JoJo's Bizarre Adventure: Eyes of Heaven (2015), J. Geil
Super Robot Wars V (2017), Soji Murakumo
Super Smash Bros. Ultimate (2018), Mii Fighter Type 9
Fate/Grand Order (2020), Odysseus
Judgment (video game) (2018), Masamichi Shintani
JoJo's Bizarre Adventure: All-Star Battle R (2022), Hanged Man
Fitness Boxing Fist of the North Star (2022), Shin

Tokusatsu
Tokumei Sentai Go-Busters Returns vs. Dōbutsu Sentai Go-Busters (2013), Great Demon Lord Azazel
Ressha Sentai ToQger (2014), Keeper Bishop
Kamen Rider Ghost (2014), Ono Ganma

Dubbing

Live-action
Bradley Cooper
The Hangover (Phil Wenneck)
The Hangover Part II (Phil Wenneck)
Silver Linings Playbook (Patrick "Pat" Solitano Jr.)
American Hustle (FBI Agent Richard "Richie" DiMaso)
The Hangover Part III (Phil Wenneck)
The Place Beyond the Pines (Avery Cross)
American Sniper (Chris Kyle)
Serena (George Pemberton)
Limitless (Eddie Morra)
Joy (Neil Walker)
War Dogs (Henry Girard)
A Star Is Born (Jackson "Jack" Maine)
The Mule (Colin Bates)
Hyun Bin
Daddy-Long-Legs (guy in flashbacks)
My Lovely Sam Soon (Hyun Jin-heon)
A Millionaire's First Love (Kang Jae-Kyung)
The Snow Queen (Han Tae Woong / Han Deuk Gu)
Secret Garden (Kim Joo-won)
The Fatal Encounter (King Jeongjo)
Confidential Assignment (Im Cheol-ryung)
Rampant (Lee Chung)
Ben Foster
30 Days of Night (The Stranger)
3:10 to Yuma (Charlie Prince)
Contraband (Sebastian Abney)
Ain't Them Bodies Saints (Patrick Wheeler)
Warcraft (Medivh)
So Ji-sub
I'm Sorry, I Love You (Cha Moo-hyuk)
Cain and Abel (Lee Cho-in / Oh Kang-ho)
Road No. 1 (Lee Jang-woo)
300 (Stelios (Michael Fassbender))
Alatriste (Conde de Guadalmedina (Eduardo Noriega))
Apollo 13 (2003 Fuji TV edition) (Seymour Liebergot (Clint Howard))
Apt Pupil (Todd Bowden (Brad Renfro))
The Art of Racing in the Rain (Denny Swift (Milo Ventimiglia))
Barton Fink (DVD edition) (Barton Fink (John Turturro))
Bedazzled (Daniel (Orlando Jones))
Big Little Lies (Perry Wright (Alexander Skarsgård))
Biker Boyz (Kid (Derek Luke))
Blade 2 (2005 TV Tokyo edition) (Snowman (Donnie Yen))
Blade: Trinity (2007 TV Tokyo edition) (Hannibal King (Ryan Reynolds))
Blade Runner 2049 (Niander Wallace (Jared Leto))
The Box (Arthur Lewis (James Marsden))
Bram Stoker's Dracula (15th Anniversary Blu-Ray edition) (Dr. Jack Seward (Richard E. Grant))
The Butler (Richard Nixon (John Cusack))
Capote (Perry Smith (Clifton Collins Jr.))
Cellular (Ryan Hewitt (Chris Evans))
Charlie Bartlett (Nathan Gardner (Robert Downey Jr.))
The Cloverfield Paradox (Gordon Mundy (Chris O'Dowd))
The Crown (John F. Kennedy (Michael C. Hall))
Cube Zero (Eric Wynn (Zachary Bennett))
The Da Vinci Code (2009 Fuji TV edition) (Youth on Bus (Shane Zaza))
Das Boot (2004 TV Tokyo edition) (Fähnrich Ullmann (Martin May))
Deadly Impact (Ryan Alba (Greg Serano))
Desperate Housewives (Lee McDermott (Kevin Rahm))
The Detonator (2009 TV Tokyo edition) (Dimitru Ilinca (Matthew Leitch))
The Devil Inside (Father Ben Rawlings (Simon Quarterman))
Dexter (Dexter Morgan (Michael C. Hall))
Dirty Sexy Money (Nick George (Peter Krause))
Doctor Sleep (Crow Daddy (Zahn McClarnon))
Driven to Kill (Stephan Abramov (Dmitry Chepovetsky))
The Dukes of Hazzard (Bo Duke (Seann William Scott))
Enemy of the State (2003 Fuji TV edition) (Selby (Seth Green))
The English Patient (Netflix edition) (Caravaggio (Willem Dafoe))
ER (Dr. Dave Malucci (Erik Palladino))
Falling Skies (season 3 onwards) (John Pope (Colin Cunningham))
The Fast and the Furious (2005 TV Asahi edition) (Leon (Johnny Strong))
The Final Girls (Kurt (Adam DeVine))
Fireproof (Caleb Holt (Kirk Cameron))
Flags of Our Fathers (Sergeant Michael Strank (Barry Pepper))
Four Brothers (Bobby Mercer (Mark Wahlberg))
Freedom Writers (Scott Casey (Patrick Dempsey))
Game of Thrones (Jaime Lannister (Nikolaj Coster-Waldau))
Goal! (Gavin Harris (Alessandro Nivola))
The Godfather (2008 Blu-Ray edition) (Carlo Rizzi (Gianni Russo))
Gone in 60 Seconds (2004 NTV edition) (Kip (Giovanni Ribisi))
Gorgeous (Pioneer LDC edition) (Long Yi (Richie Jen))
Gun Shy (Fidel Vaillar (José Zúñiga))
Gutshot Straight (Jack (George Eads))
Hansel & Gretel: Witch Hunters (Hansel (Jeremy Renner))
Hardball (Ticky Tobin (John Hawkes))
Harry Potter and the Goblet of Fire (Barty Crouch Jr (David Tennant))
Hercules (King Eurystheus (Joseph Fiennes))
Heroes (Adam Monroe/Takezo Kensei (David Anders))
Horrible Bosses (Nick Hendricks (Jason Bateman))
Horrible Bosses 2 (Nick Hendricks (Jason Bateman))
House of Gucci (Paolo Gucci (Jared Leto))
The Hungover Games (Bradley (Ross Nathan))
The Hunted (2008 TV Tokyo edition) (Bobby Moret (José Zúñiga))
The Ice Harvest (Charlie Arglist (John Cusack))
Idle Hands (Mick (Seth Green))
The Invention of Lying (Brad Kessler (Rob Lowe))
Iron Man 3 (Eric Savin (James Badge Dale))
iZombie (Blaine "DeBeers" McDonough (David Anders))
Jay and Silent Bob Strike Back (Chaka Luther King (Chris Rock))
Jojo Rabbit (Captain Klenzendorf (Sam Rockwell))
Jurassic Park III (Mark Degler (Taylor Nichols))
Kate & Leopold (Charlie McKay (Breckin Meyer))
King Arthur: Legend of the Sword (Vortigern (Jude Law))
Life (Sho Murakami (Hiroyuki Sanada))
Life or Something Like It (Pete Scanlon (Edward Burns))
Mama (Luke Desange, Jeffrey Desange (Nikolaj Coster-Waldau))
A Man Apart (DEA Agent Demetrius Hicks (Larenz Tate))
Man on a Ledge (Michael "Mike" Ackerman (Anthony Mackie))
Man on the Moon (Bob Zmuda (Paul Giamatti))
Mercenary for Justice (Dresham (Luke Goss))
Michel Vaillant (Steve Warson (Peter Youngblood Hills))
Midway (Wade McClusky (Luke Evans))
Million Dollar Baby (2006 TV Tokyo edition) (Shawrelle Berry (Anthony Mackie))
Mindhunters (Rafe Perry (Will Kemp))
Miss Congeniality (2005 NTV edition) (Eric Matthews (Benjamin Bratt))
Mission: Impossible III (Director Musgrave (Billy Crudup))
Mother, May I Sleep with Danger? (Play Director (James Franco))
Murder by Numbers (Richard Haywood (Ryan Gosling))
Nancy Drew and the Hidden Staircase (Carson Drew (Sam Trammell))
New Year's Eve (Sam Ahern Jr (Josh Duhamel))
Ocean's Eleven (2005 Fuji TV edition) (Linus Caldwell (Matt Damon))
Ocean's Twelve (2007 NTV edition) (Linus Caldwell (Matt Damon))
Ocean's Thirteen (2010 Fuji TV edition) (Linus Caldwell (Matt Damon))
On Becoming a God in Central Florida (Travis Stubbs (Alexander Skarsgård))
Once (Guy (Glen Hansard))
Passengers (Eric Clark (Patrick Wilson))
Paul, Apostle of Christ (Mauritius (Olivier Martinez))
Pearl Harbor (2004 TV Asahi edition) (First Lieutenant Rafe McCawley (Ben Affleck))
Perry Mason (Perry Mason (Matthew Rhys))
The Physician (Shah Ala ad-Daula (Olivier Martinez))
Playing by Heart (Keenan (Ryan Phillippe))
Pretty in Pink (Philip F. "Duckie" Dale (Jon Cryer))
The Program (David Walsh (Chris O'Dowd))
Red Lights (Thomas "Tom" Buckley (Cillian Murphy))
The Revenant (John Fitzgerald (Tom Hardy))
Rogue One (Bodhi Rook (Riz Ahmed))
Safe Haven (Detective Kevin Tierney (David Lyons))
Sahara (Al Giordino (Steve Zahn))
Saw 3D (Gibson (Chad Donella))
The Scorpion King (2006 NTV edition) (Takmet (Peter Facinelli))
Serenity (Malcolm Reynolds (Nathan Fillion))
Six Feet Under (Nate Fisher (Peter Krause))
Skyline (Jarrod (Eric Balfour))
So Close (2006 TV Tokyo edition) (Ma Siu-ma)
Sophie Scholl – The Final Days (Hans Fritz Scholl (Fabian Hinrichs))
Spectre (C (Andrew Scott))
The Spiderwick Chronicles (Richard Grace (Andrew McCarthy))
The Stand (Randall Flagg / "The Dark Man" (Alexander Skarsgård))
Strike (D.I. Eric Wardle (Killian Scott))
Stuart Little (2002 TV Asahi edition) (Monty (Steve Zahn))
Suits (Harvey Reginald Specter (Gabriel Macht))
T2 Trainspotting (Francis "Franco" Begbie (Robert Carlyle))
Taxi (Detective Andrew Washburn (Jimmy Fallon))
Titanic (2001 Fuji TV edition) (Harold Bride (Craig Kelly))
Top Gun (2005 NTV edition) (LT Tom "Iceman" Kazansky (Val Kilmer))
Transformers (Colonel Sharp (Glenn Morshower))
Tron: Legacy (Castor (Michael Sheen))
Tropic Thunder (Kirk Lazarus (Robert Downey Jr.))
The Veil (Nick (Reid Scott))
Venom (Dan Lewis (Reid Scott))
Venom: Let There Be Carnage (Dan Lewis (Reid Scott))
Vertical Limit (2003 TV Asahi edition) (Peter Garrett (Chris O'Donnell))
The Village (2008 NTV edition) (Noah Percy (Adrien Brody))
The West Wing (William Bailey (Joshua Malina))
When the Bough Breaks (Mike Mitchell (Theo Rossi))
Where Hope Grows (Calvin Campbell (Kristoffer Polaha))
Windtalkers (2005 TV Asahi edition) (Private Andrew Harrigan (Brian Van Holt))
XXX: State of the Union (2009 TV Asahi edition) (Agent Kyle Steele (Scott Speedman))

Animated
Kung Fu Panda (Master Mantis)
Kung Fu Panda 2 (Master Mantis)
Kung Fu Panda 3 (Master Mantis)
Moomins on the Riviera (White Shadow)
Rango (Ezekiel)
Return to Never Land (Edward)
Star Wars: Droids (2005 DVD edition) (Jann Tosh)

References

External links
 

1967 births
Living people
Aoni Production voice actors
Japanese male stage actors
Japanese male video game actors
Japanese male voice actors
Male voice actors from Gifu Prefecture
Meijo University alumni
20th-century Japanese male actors
21st-century Japanese male actors